Romuald Thomas (18 June 1922 – 23 January 1998) was a Polish rower. He competed in the men's coxed pair event at the 1952 Summer Olympics.

References

1922 births
1998 deaths
People from Pastavy District
Polish male rowers
Olympic rowers of Poland
Rowers at the 1952 Summer Olympics